Sugarland is a country music duo.

Sugarland or Sugar Land may also refer to:

Sugar Land, Texas, a city sometimes misspelled as "Sugarland"
The Sugarlands, a valley in the Southeastern United States
The Sugarland Express, 1974 film by Steven Spielberg
Sugarland (EP), an EP by Magnapop